Trachyandra tortilis is a species of succulent in the genus Trachyandra. It is endemic to the Cape Provinces of South Africa.

Distribution 
Trachyandra tortilis is found in the Richtersveld and Namaqualand, southwards to Vredendal, Hopefield and Saron.

Conservation status 
Trachyandra tortilis is classified as Least Concern as it is widespread and not threatened.

References

External links 
 
 

Endemic flora of South Africa
Flora of South Africa
Flora of the Cape Provinces
tortilis